Charon is a discontinued web browser for the Inferno operating system. It had a limited support for JavaScript but none for CSS.

It was originally written by Howard Trickey in Limbo for Inferno. It runs under the wm window manager, but can also run directly on the draw device. As part of the acme standalone project, Charon was implemented as a client to run inside acme.

References

External links
Plan 9 Web Browsers
Inferno's charon(1) man page

Inferno (operating system)
Web browsers for Plan 9
Free web browsers